The York Lions women's ice hockey team represents York University in Toronto, Ontario in the sport of ice hockey in the Ontario University Athletics conference of U Sports. The York Lions have won three OUA championships in their program history while making one appearance in the U Sports women's ice hockey championship tournament since its inception in 1998.

History
On February 11, 2000, the Ontario University Athletics women's ice hockey program saw its longest game take place. The University of Toronto's Rhonda Mitchell scored on a 35-foot slap shot. It was the 5:07 mark of the eighth period and the Varsity Blues defeated York University. Although the victory allowed the U of T to advance to the OUA gold medal game, it was the longest in the history of Canadian women's hockey (since broken). The game lasted over five hours and ten minutes. York's player of the game was goaltender Debra Ferguson, as she valiantly made 63 saves over 125 minutes.

On February 5, 2011, two Lions players, forward Courtney Unruh and defender Kelsey Webster (and assistant coach Stacey Colarossi) were part of the Team Canada roster that captured gold at the 2011 Winter Universiade title as Canada defeated Finland 4–1 in the gold-medal final. Autumn Mills was the Ontario University Athletics (OUA) nominee for the 2011 Canadian Interuniversity Sport (CIS) Marion Hillard Award.

After seven years of finishing out of the playoffs, the 2019-20 Lions team finished with a  record and a third-place finish in the OUA. The Lions swept both the Waterloo Warriors and Nipissing Lakers in the OUA playoffs before losing the McCaw Cup championship to the Toronto Varsity Blues in a sudden death 1–3 loss. Because the Lions were an OUA finalist, the team qualified for the U Sports women's ice hockey championship for the first time in program history in 2020. However, because of the COVID-19 pandemic in Canada, the tournament was cancelled on the day that the Lions were scheduled to play against the McGill Martlets in the opening round game. The 2020–21 season was cancelled due to the pandemic and the Lions finished last in their division following their return to play in 2021–22.

Recent results

International contests

Lions in pro hockey

Lions selected in the CWHL Draft

Lions selected in the NWHL Draft
Taylor Davison made U Sports history, becoming the highest drafted player from a U Sports team to be taken in the NWHL Draft. As a side note, Davison's selection was announced by Angela James.

Awards and honours

Team MVP
This is an incomplete list
2009-10: Kelsey Webster
2010-11: Courtney Unruh 
2011-12: Lisa Stathopulos 
2012-13: Lisa Stathopulos
2013-14: Megan Lee
2014-15: Lisa Stathopulos
2015-16: Megan Lee
2016-17: Erin Locke 
2017-18: Erin Locke 
2018-19: Erin Locke 
2019-20:

School honours
Autumn Mills, York University female athlete of the week for the period ending Jan. 30, 2011.
 2011 York Lions Athletics Bryce M. Taylor Award: Autumn Mills
 2012 York Lions Athletics Female Rookie of the Year, Kristen Barbara
2015 Charles Saundercook Memorial Trophy: Lisa Stathopulos
2016 Roar Cup
2021 Sport Council Award: Lauren Dubie (co-winner with rugby player Lauren Walter)

Lions Legacy Awards
2015 Lions Legacy Awards: Kiri Langford Co-winner 
2016 Lions Legacy Awards: Megan Lee
2017 Lions Legacy Awards: Rianna Langford and Amy Locke (co-winner with soccer player Marilyn Grammenopoulos and track & field competitor Muad Issa)
2019 Lions Legacy Awards: Jenna Gray (co-winner with volleyball player Cadence Currie and track & field athlete Bailey Francis)
2021 Lions Legacy Awards: Kaleb Dahlgren and Lauren Dubie (co-winner with soccer player Teni Odetoyinbo)

U Sports honours
Kelsey Webster, 2010 All-CIS Second Team
Kristen Barbara, CIS All-Rookie Team (2011–12)

OUA honours
Lisa Stathopulos, OUA Most Valuable Player (2014–15)
Erin Locke, OUA Marion Hilliard Award (2019–20)

OUA in-season
Autumn Mills, Pioneer Petroleums Ontario University Athletics (OUA) female athlete of the week for the period ending Jan. 30, 2011.

OUA All-Stars

First Team
Marnie Barow, First Team (1990–91)
Marnie Barow, Second Team (1991–92)
Marnie Barow, First Team (1992–93)
Michelle Clayton, First Team (1993–94)
Michelle Clayton, First Team (1995–96)
Taylor Davison, First Team (2019–20)
Allyson Fox, First Team (1996–97)
Debra Ferguson, First Team (1996–97)
Sari Krooks, First Team (1996–97)
Sari Krooks,  First Team (1999–2000)
Katie Quinn, First Team (1995–96)
Melanie Roach, First Team (1998–99)
Melanie Roach, First Team (1999–2000)
Kelsey Webster, 2010 All-OUA First Team

Second Team
Heather Balbraith, Second Team (1996–97)
Michelle Campbell, Second Team (1989–90)
Michelle Clayton, Second Team (1994–95)
Allyson Fox, Second Team (1995–96)
Allyson Fox, Second Team (1997–98)
Collette Good, Second Team (1997–98)
Karent Kett, Second Team (1998–99)
Katie Quinn, Second Team (1993–94)
Katie Quinn, Second Team (1994–95)
Shanley White, Second Team (1997–98)

Postseason awards
Debra Ferguson, Player of the Game, OWIAA Final (February 25, 1997) 
Debra Ferguson, Player of the Game, OUA Semifinal (February 11, 2000)
Collette Good, Player of the Game, OWIAA Semi-final (February 24, 1997)

International
In April 2011, Lions player Kiri Langford was a member of the New Zealand national team that won the gold medal at the 2011 IIHF World Women's Championship Division IV competition in Reykjavik, Iceland.
During the month of August 2011, it was announced that Lions head coach Dan Church would also serve as the head coach during the  2011–12 Canada women's national ice hockey team.

Dan Church Head Coach : 2009 Winter Universiade

References

York University
York Lions women's ice hockey